Szymon Piotr Kołecki (born 12 October 1981) is a Polish former Olympic Champion weightlifter and current mixed martial artist. He was the silver medalist at the 2000 Olympic Games in Sydney and a gold medalist at the 2008 Olympic Games in Beijing, both in the 94 kg categories.

Weightlifting career

Olympics 
In 2000 he competed at the 2000 Olympic Games in the 94 kg category as a junior. After the snatch portion of the competition he was in third place, behind Kourosh Bagheri and Kakhi Kakhiashvili. During the clean & jerk portion of the competition he was in second place with his first lift of 222.5 kg, that brought his total to 405.0 kg which tied the total of Kakhi Kakhiashvili. He attempted a lift of 227.5 kg, but was unable to make the lift and did not take another attempt. Kakhi Kakhiashvili, due to a light bodyweight (92.06 kg vs. 93.58 kg) was the gold medallist, with Kołecki taking home the silver medal. The 94 kg category had a spread of only 7.5 kg separating the 6th place finisher and the gold medalist.

He was unable to participate in the 2004 Olympic Games due to a failed drug test. His B samples tested positive for the banned anabolic steroid nandrolone.

In 2008 he returned to the Olympics and competed in the 94 kg category at the 2008 Olympic Games. After the snatch portion of the competition he was in fourth place, behind Khadzhimurat Akkayev, Ilya Ilyin, Asghar Ebrahimi and Nizami Pashayev. In the clean & jerk portion he lifted 224 kg placing him in second place behind Ilya Ilyin's lift of 226 kg, he attempted a would-be Olympic Record lift of 228 kg but was unable to make the lift. Ilya Ilyin was the original gold medalist with Kołecki taking home the silver medal. In 2016 Ilya Ilyin was suspended due to failed samples containing Stanozolol and was disqualified from the 2008 Olympic Games, as a result Kołecki was awarded the gold medal.

Other Information 
Kołecki represented team Górnik Polkowice. He is 6'1" (1.85 m). His career was put on hold in the early 2000s (decade), due to a serious back injury.

Kołecki returned to weightlifting in late 2005, winning European Championships a few months later. He was also a member of Polish national team for the 2008 Olympic Games in Beijing, during which he claimed that his recently shaved head had a covert political message.

For his sport achievements, Kołecki received: 
 Golden Cross of Merit in 2000; 
 Knight's Cross of the Order of Polonia Restituta (5th Class) in 2008.

Major results

Mixed martial arts career 
After amassing a professional mixed martial arts record of 6–1, Kołecki was signed to KSW. He made his promotional debut against Mariusz Pudzianowski in a heavyweight bout at KSW 47. Kołecki won the fight after Pudzianowski suffered a leg injury in the first round.

Next, Kołecki faced Damian Janikowski at KSW 52 on 7 December 2019. He won the fight via a second round knockout.

Kołecki was scheduled to face Łukasz Jurkowski at KSW 55: Askham vs. Khalidov 2 on 10 October 2020. However, Kołecki had to withdraw from the bout due to an injury.

Kołecki then competed at KSW 58: Kołecki vs. Zawada against Martin Zawada on 30 January 2021. He won the fight via unanimous decision.

Kołecki faced Akop Szostak on 17 July 2021 at KSW 62: Kołecki vs. Szostak. He won the bout via knockout in the first minute off the bout.

Mixed martial arts record 

|-
|Win
|align=center|10–1
| Akop Szostak
| KO (punch)
| KSW 62: Kołecki vs. Szostak
|
|align=center|1
|align=center|0:47
|Warszawa, Poland
|
|-
|Win
|align=center|9–1
| Martin Zawada
| Decision (unanimous)
| KSW 58: Kołecki vs. Zawada
|
|align=center|3
|align=center|5:00
|Łódź, Poland
|
|-
|Win
|align=center|8–1
| Damian Janikowski
| TKO (punches)
| KSW 52: Race
|
|align=center|2
|align=center|3:03
|Gliwice, Poland
| 
|-
| Win
| align=center| 7–1
| Mariusz Pudzianowski
| 	TKO (leg injury)
|KSW 47: The X-Warriors
|  
| align=center| 1
| align=center| 4:29
| Łódź, Poland
|
|-
| Loss
| align=center| 6–1
| Michał Bobrowski
| Decision (unanimous)
| Babilon MMA 5 – Kołecki vs Bobrowski
| 
| align=center| 3
| align=center| 5:00
| Międzyzdroje, Poland
|
|-
| Win
| align=center| 6–0
| Ivo Cuk
| TKO (punches)
| Babilon MMA 4 – Kołecki vs Cuk
| 
| align=center| 1
| align=center| 0:45
| Ełk, Poland
| 
|-
| Win
| align=center| 5–0
| Łukasz Borowski
| TKO (elbows)
| Babilon MMA 3 – Kołecki vs Borowski
| 
| align=center| 1
| align=center| 2:55
| Radom, Poland
| 
|-
| Win
| align=center| 4–0
| Michał Orkowski
| TKO (punches)
| Babilon MMA 2 – Kołecki vs Orkowski
| 
| align=center| 1
| align=center| 3:39
| Legionowo, Poland
|
|-
| Win
| align=center| 3–0
| Łukasz Łysoniewski
| TKO (punches)
| UBS 9 – 2nd Memorial Wieslawa Pazgana
| 
| align=center| 1
| align=center| 3:00
| Wieliczka, Poland
| 
|-
| Win
| align=center| 2–0
| Wojciech Balejko
| TKO (punches)
| PLMMA 73 – Ciechanow
| 
| align=center| 1
| align=center| 2:19
| Ciechanów, Poland
|
|-
| Win
| align=center| 1–0
| Dariusz Kazmierczuk
| TKO (punches)
| PLMMA 72 – Lomianki
| 
| align=center| 1
| align=center| 0:33
| Łomianki, Poland
| 
|-

See also 
 List of current KSW fighters
 List of male mixed martial artists

References

External links 
 
 
 
 

1981 births
Living people
Olympic silver medalists for Poland
Olympic weightlifters of Poland
Polish male weightlifters
Weightlifters at the 2000 Summer Olympics
Weightlifters at the 2008 Summer Olympics
World record setters in weightlifting
Olympic medalists in weightlifting
People from Oława
Medalists at the 2008 Summer Olympics
Polish sportspeople in doping cases
Sportspeople from Lower Silesian Voivodeship
Medalists at the 2000 Summer Olympics
Olympic gold medalists for Poland
Polish male mixed martial artists
Light heavyweight mixed martial artists
Heavyweight mixed martial artists
Mixed martial artists utilizing Brazilian jiu-jitsu
European Weightlifting Championships medalists
World Weightlifting Championships medalists
Polish practitioners of Brazilian jiu-jitsu